Shoyoroll is an American jiu-jitsu lifestyle brand that designs and manufactures Brazilian jiu-jitsu gi, casual apparel, and accessories headquartered in Los Alamitos, California. It is one of the most popular jiu-jitsu brands in the world.

History

Shoyoroll was founded by Vince “Bear” Quitugua in 2006. Bear started making t-shirts and caps to show off his creative side inside his garage in Guam. Budo Videos, a martial arts online retailer, started to exclusively sell Shoyoroll gis in North America in 2009.

Partnerships
Shoyoroll have made collaborations with other brands and companies such as Illest, EA Sports, Undefeated, Albino and Preto and RVCA.

See also
 Mixed martial arts clothing

References

External links
 

Sporting goods manufacturers of the United States
Sportswear brands
Companies based in California
Clothing companies established in 2006
2006 establishments in California